Georg Andreas Böckler (c. 1617 – 21 February 1687) was a German architect and engineer who wrote Architectura Curiosa Nova (1664) and Theatrum Machinarum Novum (1661).

Biography
Born in Cronheim, he was an architect in the city of Nuremberg and specialized in hydraulic architecture. Architectura Curiosa Nova was his most important work. It is mainly a book on theory and application of hydrodynamics for fountains, water-jets, garden fountains and well heads with many designs for free-standing fountains. The fourth part includes designs for grottoes and garden pavilions. In 1661 Böckler wrote Theatrum Machinarum Novum, an important work on windmills, pumps and other hydraulic machines. Böckler died in Ansbach. His brother Johann Heinrich Boeckler was a polymath.

Notes

References

External links

A webpage with illustrations of fountains from Architecturea Curiosa Nova, Pars Tertia
Online text of Theatrum machinarum novum
 Books on line on the Architectura website: http://architectura.cesr.univ-tours.fr/Traite/Auteur/Bockler.asp?param=en
 http://www.theatra.de/repertorium/ed000028.pdf

Architects from Nuremberg
Engineers from Nuremberg
1610s births
1687 deaths